José Luis Albareda y Sezde (1828, El Puerto de Santa María – November 3, 1897) was a Spanish politician and journalist. He was Minister of Public Works during the reign of Alfonso XII and Minister of the Interior during the regency of Maria Cristina of Austria. As minister of public works, he instigated the National Exhibition of Mining, held in 1883.

Politics
A member of the Partido Liberal he became a deputy of Cadiz Privince in the elections celebrated between 1863 and 1865. Later, he was elected in Alicante between 1869 and 1876. He went on to serve in Seville (province) between 1879 and 1884. In 1887 he was chosen as a senator representing Seville, and in 1891 representing Palencia (province). In 1893 he was named life senator. Between February 8 of 1881 and January 9 of 1883 he was Minister of Public Works under Sagasta, later serving as Minister of Interior between November 12, 1887 and the June 14, 1888.

Literature
He was also a newspaper founder and director of numerous political papers, expressing deep-rooted support for the political liberalization of Spain. He was also civil governor of Madrid (1871) and ambassador of Spain in Paris and London.

1828 births
1897 deaths
People from El Puerto de Santa María
Progressive Party (Spain) politicians
Constitutional Party (Spain) politicians
Liberal Party (Spain, 1880) politicians
Government ministers of Spain
Members of the Congress of Deputies (Spain)
Members of the Congress of Deputies of the Spanish Restoration
Members of the Senate of Spain
Politicians from Andalusia
Ambassadors of Spain to France
Ambassadors of Spain to the United Kingdom of Great Britain and Ireland
19th-century Spanish journalists
Male journalists
19th-century male writers
Civil governors of Madrid